Máté Pátkai (born 6 March 1988) is a Hungarian football player who currently plays for Vasas.

Club career

MTK Budapest
Pátkai started his club career in MTK Budapest FC where he scored 15 goals in 101 matches.

Győr
Pátkai was purchased by Győri ETO FC in 2012.

Club statistics

Updated to games played as of 1 June 2021.

Honours

MTK
 Nemzeti Bajnokság I: 2007-08
 Hungarian Super Cup: 2008

Győri ETO FC
 Nemzeti Bajnokság I: 2012-13
Hungarian Super Cup: 2013

Videoton
 Nemzeti Bajnokság I: 2017-18
 Hungarian Cup: 2018-19

International career
On 16 October 2012 Hungary battled back to beat Turkey at home 3–1. Pátkai was substituted for Elek in the break of the match.

International goals
Scores and results list Hungary's goal tally first.

References

Máté Pátkai profile at magyarfutball.hu
MLSZ 
HLSZ 

1988 births
Living people
Footballers from Budapest
Hungarian footballers
Hungary international footballers
Hungary under-21 international footballers
Association football midfielders
MTK Budapest FC players
Győri ETO FC players
Fehérvár FC players
Vasas SC players
Nemzeti Bajnokság I players
Nemzeti Bajnokság II players